Pensamientos (English: Thoughts) is the twentieth studio album written, produced and performed by Mexican singer-songwriter Juan Gabriel. It was released on November 11, 1986. It was his last studio album until 1994, when his legal battle against his label ended.

Track listing

Personnel 
Juan Gabriel – Producer
Chuck Anderson – Arranger, director
David Esquivel  — Musical Engineer
Carlos Ceballos — Musical Engineer
Stan Ross — Musical Engineer
Ryan Uliate — Musical Engineer
Arriba Juárez No. 1  — Mariachi
Alberto Reyna — Graphic design
Joel García — Carátula

Chart performance

References

External links

1986 albums
Juan Gabriel albums
RCA Records albums
Spanish-language albums